Brazil competes at the World Artistic Gymnastics Championships since the 1978 edition of the tournament. Brazil's governing body in Gymnastics is the Brazilian Gymnastics Confederation (Portuguese: Confederação Brasileira de Ginástica – CBG), established in 1978, which selects athletes to compete at official FIG competitions, including the World Artistic Gymnastics Championships.

Medalists

Source:

Medal tables

By gender

By event

By athlete

Participants

Women's Artistic Gymnastics 

 1978: Lilian Carrascoza.
 1979: Silvia dos Anjos, Lilian Carrascoza, Marian Fernandes, Cláudia Magalhães, Jacqueline Pires, Altair Prado.
 1981: Danilce Campos, Lilian Carrascoza, Carine Leão, Cláudia Magalhães, Jacqueline Pires, Altair Prado.
 1983: Danilce Campos, Marian Fernandes, Tatiana Figueiredo, Cláudia Magalhães, Jacqueline Pires, Altair Prado.
 1985: Marian Fernandes, Tatiana Figueiredo, Elena Fournogerakis, Vanda Oliveira, Jacqueline Pires, Altair Prado.
 1987: Marian Fernandes, Tatiana Figueiredo, Vanda Oliveira, Luisa Parente, Priscilla Steinberger, Margaret Yada.
 1989: Adriane Andrade, Anna Fernandes, Anna Paula Luck, Daniela Mesquita, Luisa Parente, Margaret Yada.
 1991: Debora Biffe, Marina Fagundes, Anna Fernandes, Luisa Parente.
 1992: Debora Biffe, Viviane Cardoso, Luisa Parente.
 1993: Soraya Carvalho.
 1994: Silvia Mendes, Adriana Silami, Leticia Ishii.
 1995: Soraya Carvalho, Beatriz Degani, Mariana Gonçalves, Leticia Ishii, Liliane Koreipasu, Beatrice Martins, Melissa Sugimote.
 1996: Soraya Carvalho, Beatrice Martins, Leticia Ishii, Mariana Gonçalves.
 1997: Patricia Aoki, Mariana Gonçalves.
 1999: Heine Araújo, Camila Comin, Marilia Gomes, Daniele Hypólito, Stefani Salani, Daiane dos Santos.
 2001: Heine Araújo, Coral Borda, Camila Comin, Daniele Hypólito, Stefani Salani, Daiane dos Santos.
 2002: Camila Comin, Daniele Hypólito, Caroline Molinari.
 2003: Camila Comin, Daniele Hypólito, Caroline Molinari, Ana Paula Rodrigues, Daiane dos Santos, Laís Souza.
 2005: Camila Comin, Daniele Hypólito, Daiane dos Santos.
 2006: Camila Comin, Bruna da Costa, Daniele Hypólito, Daiane dos Santos, Juliana Santos, Laís Souza.
 2007: Jade Barbosa, Khiuani Dias, Daniele Hypólito, Daiane dos Santos, Ana Cláudia Silva, Laís Souza.
 2009: Bruna Leal, Khiuani Dias, Ethiene Franco, Priscila Cobello.
 2010: Jade Barbosa, Priscila Cobello, Ethiene Franco, Adrian Gomes, Daniele Hypólito, Bruna Leal. Alternate: Gabriela Soares
 2011: Jade Barbosa, Adrian Gomes, Daniele Hypólito, Bruna Leal, Daiane dos Santos, Ana Cláudia Silva. Alternate: Priscila Cobello
 2013: Leticia Costa, Daniele Hypólito.
 2014: Leticia Costa, Isabelle Cruz, Daniele Hypólito, Maria Cecília Cruz, Mariana Oliveira, Julie Sinmon. Alternate: Mariana Valentin.
 2015: Jade Barbosa, Daniele Hypólito, Thauany Lee, Letícia Costa, Flávia Saraiva, Lorrane Oliveira. Alternate: Lorenna Antunes.
 2017: Rebeca Andrade, Thais Fidelis.
 2018: Jade Barbosa, Rebeca Andrade, Thais Fidelis, Flávia Saraiva, Lorrane Oliveira. Alternate: Anna Júlia Reis.
 2019: Jade Barbosa, Letícia Costa, Thais Fidelis, Flávia Saraiva, Lorrane Oliveira. Alternate: Isabel Barbosa.
 2021: Rebeca Andrade.
 2022: Rebeca Andrade, Flávia Saraiva, Lorrane Oliveira, Júlia Soares, Carolyne Pedro. Alternate: Christal Bezerra

Junior World medalists

References

External links
 Gymn-Forum.net (participants from 1979 to 2007)
 GymnasticsResults.com (participants from 1994 to 2015)

World Artistic Gymnastics Championships
Gymnastics in Brazil